The Indore–Patna Express is an Express Train of the Indian Railways, which runs between Indore Junction railway station of Indore, the largest city and commercial hub of Central Indian state Madhya Pradesh and Patna Junction, railway station of Patna, the capital city of Bihar.  there are two regular trains linking Indore with Patna; they are numbered 19313 and 19321.  the train ran twice a week with one of these two services routed via Lalitpur and Sultanpur, both in Uttar Pradesh.

Trains 19313 and 19314

Arrival and departure
Train no.19313 departs from Indore every at Wednesday at 14:00 hrs. from platform no.5 reaching Patna Junction the next day at 16:00 hrs.
Train no.19314 departs from Patna, every Thursday at 17:20 hrs., reaching Indore the next day at 12:30 hrs.

Route and halts
The train goes via Bhopal and Sultanpur. The important halts of the train are:
 INDORE JUNCTION
 Dewas
 Ujjain Junction
 Shajapur
 Bhopal Bairagarh
 Bhopal Junction
 Bina Junction
 Jhansi Junction
 Orai
 Kanpur Central
 Lucknow
 Varanasi Junction
 Mughal Sarai Junction
 PATNA JUNCTION

Coach composite
The train consists of 22 coaches :
 2 AC II Tier
 2 AC III Tier
 12 Sleeper Coaches
 4 Unreserved
 1 Ladies/Handicapped
 1 Luggage/Brake van

Average speed and frequency
The train runs with an average speed of 63 km/h. The train runs on Weekly basis.

Trains 19321 and 19322

The Indore – Rajendra Nagar (Via. Faizabad) Express is a Weekly Express train of the Indian Railways, which runs between Indore Junction, Madhya Pradesh and Rajendra Nagar, Patna, Bihar.

Arrival and departure
The train runs with an average speed of 63 km/h. The train runs on a weekly basis.

Train no.19321 departs from Indore every Saturday at 14:00 hrs. from platform no.5 reaching Rajendra Nagar Bihar the next day at  16:45 hrs.
Train no.19322 departs from Rajendra Nagar every Sunday at 20:20 hrs., reaching Indore the next day at 13:30 hrs.

Route and halts
The train goes via Ujjain & Lucknow. The important halts of the train are :
 INDORE JUNCTION
 Dewas
 Ujjain Junction
 Shujalpur
 Bhopal Bairagarh
 Bhopal Junction
 Bina Junction
 Jhansi Junction
 Orai
 Kanpur Central
 Lucknow
 Akbarpur
 Faizabad Junction
 Ayodhya
 Jaunpur Junction
 Varanasi Junction
 Mughal Sarai Junction
 Patna Junction
  RAJENDRA NAGAR TERMINAL

Equipment
The train is hauled by Ratlam RTM WDM-3 Diesel engine.
The train consists of 23 Coaches :
 1 AC I Tier
 2 AC II Tier
 2 AC III Tier
 12 Sleeper Coaches
 4 Un Reserved
 1 Ladies/Handicapped
1 Luggage/Brake Van

The train was maintained by the Indore Coaching Depot. The same rake is used for Indore - Patna Express, Indore - Pune Express, Indore - Nagpur Express and Shipra Express for one way which is altered by the second rake on the other way. Much of this equipment was destroyed in the Pukhrayan train derailment.

Accidents and incidents

On 20 November 2016, fourteen coaches of the train no. 19321 derailed near Kanpur, killing 150 passengers with about 300 being injured.

See also
Indore Express
Indore Junction
Bhopal Junction

References

Express trains in India
Transport in Indore
Transport in Bhopal
Railway services introduced in 1995
Rail transport in Madhya Pradesh
Transport in Patna